Bargaon is an archaeological site of the Indus Valley civilisation. It is in Saharanpur District, Uttar Pradesh, India.

Late Harappan
This site belongs to late Harappan period, with a mixture of Ochre Coloured Pottery.

See also
 Indus Valley civilization
 List of Indus Valley Civilization sites

References

External links
Location of Bargaon in IVC 

Archaeology of India
Indus Valley civilisation sites
Archaeological sites in Uttar Pradesh
Saharanpur district